You Don't Know Love my refer to:
"You Don't Know Love" (Editors song)
"You Don't Know Love" (Janie Fricke song)
"You Don't Know Love" (Olly Murs song)